Cherry Knowle Hospital was a mental health facility in Ryhope, Tyne and Wear, England. It was managed by the South of Tyne and Wearside Mental Health NHS Trust.

History
The hospital was designed by George Thomas Hine using a Compact Arrow layout and construction began in 1893. It was opened as the Sunderland Borough Asylum in 1895. A villa block was added in 1902. Further development took place in the 1930s when an admissions hospital and convalescent villas were built.

During the Second World War emergency medical service huts were established on the site: these were later developed to create Ryhope General hospital.

The asylum joined the National Health Service as Cherry Knowle Hospital in 1948. After the introduction of Care in the Community in the early 1980s, the hospital went into a period of decline and closed in 1998. The buildings were largely demolished in 2011 and the site is being redeveloped for residential use.

The Hopewood Park mental health campus opened on the site in 2014.

References

Hospitals in Tyne and Wear
Hospital buildings completed in 1895
Hospitals established in 1895
1895 establishments in England
Former psychiatric hospitals in England
Defunct hospitals in England
Sunderland